This is a list of noise topics.

Engineering and physics

 1/f noise
 A-weighting
 Ambient noise level
 Antenna noise temperature
 Artificial noise
 Audio noise reduction
 Audio system measurements
 Black noise
 Blue noise
 Burst noise
 Carrier-to-receiver noise density
 Channel noise level
 Circuit noise level
 Colors of noise
 Comfort noise
 Comfort noise generator
 Cosmic noise
 Crackling noise
 DBa
 DBrn
 Decibel
 Detection theory
 Dither
 Dynamic range
 Effective input noise temperature
 Environmental noise
 Equivalent noise resistance
 Equivalent pulse code modulation noise
 Errors and residuals in statistics
 Fixed pattern noise
 Flicker noise
 Gaussian noise
 Generation-recombination noise
 Image noise
 Image noise reduction
 Intermodulation noise
 Internet background noise
 ITU-R 468 noise weighting
 Jansky noise
 Johnson–Nyquist noise, Johnson noise
 Line noise
 Mode partition noise
 Neuronal noise
 Noise
 Noise (audio)
 Noise (economic)
 Noise (electronic)
 Noise (environmental)
 Noise (physics)
 Noise (radio)
 Noise (video)
 Noise current
 Noise-equivalent power
 Noise figure
 Noise floor
 Noise gate
 Noise generator
 Noise level
 Noise measurement
 Noise power
 Noise print
 Noise shaping
 Noise temperature
 Noise wall
 Noise weighting
 Noisy black
 Noisy white
 Peak signal-to-noise ratio
 Perlin noise
 Phase noise
 Photon noise
 Pink noise
 Pseudonoise=pseudorandom noise
 Quantization noise
 Quantum 1/f noise
 Radio noise source
 Random noise
 Received noise power
 Red noise
 Reference noise
 Salt and pepper noise
 Shot noise
 Signal-to-noise ratio
 Statistical noise
 Stochastic resonance
 Tape hiss
 Thermal noise
 Underwater acoustics
 White noise
 White noise machine

Environmental

 Acoustic noise
 Artificial noise
 Aircraft noise
 Background noise
 Impulse noise
 Industrial noise
 Noise barrier
 Noise control
 Noise health effects
 Noise pollution
 Noise regulation
 Roadway noise
 Train noise

Noise reduction

 Active noise control = anti-noise
 DBX (noise reduction)
 Differential signaling
 Dolby noise reduction system
 Helicopter noise reduction
 Hush kit
 Low noise amplifier
 Low-noise block converter
 Muffler
 Noise barrier
 Noise cancellation
 Noise-cancelling headphone
 Noise control
 Noise mitigation
 Noise reduction
 Noise regulation
 RF shielding
 Sound proofing
 Suppressor

Music

 Noise in music
 Art of Noises
 Difference between music and noise
 Harsh noise
 Harsh noise wall
 List of noise musicians
 List of Japanoise artists
 Noise music
 Noise pop
 Noise rock
 Power noise

See also 
 DB drag racing
 List of environment topics

External links
 Noboomers

Noise
Noise
Noise topics
Noise topics
Noise (electronics)